HMCS Rockcliffe was a reciprocating engine-powered  built for the Royal Canadian Navy during the Second World War. Following the war, the ship saw service as training vessel before being scrapped in 1960.

Design and description
The ships' complement consisted of 85 officers and ratings.

The reciprocating ships had two vertical triple-expansion steam engines, each driving one shaft, using steam provided by two Admiralty three-drum boilers.

The Algerine class was armed with a QF  Mk V anti-aircraft gun and four twin-gun mounts for Oerlikon 20 mm cannon. The latter guns were in short supply when the first ships were being completed and they often got a proportion of single mounts. By 1944, single-barrel Bofors 40 mm mounts began replacing the twin 20 mm mounts on a one for one basis. All of the ships were fitted for four throwers and two rails for depth charges. Many Canadian ships omitted their sweeping gear in exchange for a 24-barrel Hedgehog spigot mortar and a stowage capacity for 90+ depth charges.

Construction and career
Named after Rockliffe Park, a suburb of Ottawa, Ontario, Rockcliffe was laid down on 23 December 1942 by Port Arthur Shipbuilding Co. Ltd. at Port Arthur, Ontario. The ship was launched on 19 August 1943 and commissioned into the Royal Canadian Navy at Port Arthur on 30 September 1944.

Following her commissioning, Rockcliffe sailed up the St. Lawrence River to Halifax, Nova Scotia. She was sent to Bermuda to work up and upon her return to Halifax in mid-December 1944, was assigned to the Western Escort Force for convoy escort duties in the Battle of the Atlantic. The minesweeper joined escort group W-6 with which she remained until June 1945 when it was disbanded. On 10 May 1945 she was part of the group that captured the German Type IX submarine . She escorted the submarine to Shelburne, Nova Scotia.

Rockcliffe was paid off into reserve on 28 July 1945 at Sydney, Nova Scotia, she was then transferred to the west coast arriving at Esquimalt, British Columbia on 14 January 1946. On 3 March 1947, the minesweeper was recommissioned for use as a training ship. In 1948, the minesweeper was used for oceanographic duties. Rockcliffe was paid off on 15 August 1950  for the final time. Rockcliffe was sold for scrap on 24 March 1960 and broken up at Vancouver.

After decommissioning the ship's bell was presented to the officer's mess at CFB Rockcliffe on 30 May 1967 and formed part of the chandelier.

See also
 List of ships of the Canadian Navy

References

Bibliography

External links 
 Haze Gray and Underway
 ReadyAyeReady.com

Algerine-class minesweepers of the Royal Canadian Navy
Ships built in Ontario
1943 ships
World War II minesweepers of Canada
World War II escort ships of Canada